Gheorghe Petrescu (born 28 February 1919) was a Romanian football defender. He played 23 from a total of 24 matches of the 1940–41 season, in which Unirea Tricolor won the championship.

International career
Gheorghe Petrescu played two games for Romania, making his debut under coach Iuliu Baratky at the 1948 Balkan Cup in a 3–2 victory against Bulgaria. His second game was also at the 1948 Balkan Cup, playing in a 2–1 victory against Czechoslovakia.

Honours
Unirea Tricolor București
Divizia A: 1940–41
Divizia B: 1938–39
Cupa României runner-up: 1935–36, 1940–41

References

External links
Gheorghe Petrescu player profile at Labtof.ro

1919 births
Romanian footballers
Romania international footballers
Association football defenders
Liga I players
Liga II players
Unirea Tricolor București players
FC Petrolul Ploiești players
Year of death missing